North River High School was a historic public school building located at Moscow, Augusta County, Virginia. Built in 1930, it was a brick building consisting of an auditorium/gymnasium as the core of the building with rectangular gabled blocks on either side containing two rooms with the projecting gable ends.  It had a steeply pitched gable roof and entrance portico reflecting the Colonial Revival style.  Additions were made to the building in 1942 and 1950.  Also on the property was a contributing brick agriculture building.

It was listed on the National Register of Historic Places in 1985.

References

School buildings on the National Register of Historic Places in Virginia
Colonial Revival architecture in Virginia
School buildings completed in 1930
Schools in Augusta County, Virginia
National Register of Historic Places in Augusta County, Virginia
1930 establishments in Virginia